Many actors have been considered for the part of The Doctor in the British science fiction television show Doctor Who. The casting announcement is a significant event for fans of the show, and is speculated on by news media. The following is a list of actors who have been considered for the role.

First Doctor 
Geoffrey Bayldon declined the role of the Doctor because it was scheduled for 52 weeks and required him to play an old man. He told his agent, "Tell them: Too long, too old". He later played an alternative version of the Doctor in two plays for the Doctor Who Unbound series of audio plays by Big Finish Productions: Auld Mortality (2003) and A Storm of Angels (2005). In addition, he played Organon in the Fourth Doctor serial The Creature from the Pit (1979).

Hugh David was the choice of Rex Tucker, who was the series' "caretaker producer" before the arrival of Verity Lambert. Lambert rejected this idea on the grounds that at 38, Hugh was too young. David later became a director and, in that capacity, worked on the Second Doctor serials The Highlanders (1966–7) and Fury from the Deep.

Alan Webb was then offered the role but declined, as did Cyril Cusack.

Leslie French was considered for the role. He later appeared in the Seventh Doctor serial Silver Nemesis (1988) as Lady Peinforte's mathematician.

The role of the First Doctor went to William Hartnell.

Second Doctor 
Brian Blessed was offered the role, but declined because of scheduling conflicts; he later played King Yrcanos in the Sixth Doctor serial The Trial of a Time Lord. Rupert Davies, Valentine Dyall and Sir Michael Hordern were all approached for the role but none wanted to commit to a long-running series. Dyall later played the Black Guardian in the television stories The Armageddon Factor (1979), Mawdryn Undead (1983), Terminus (1983) and Enlightenment (1983) and Slarn in the audio drama Slipback (1985). Peter Cushing was also offered the role, but declined and later regretted his decision. He appeared in the big-screen versions of Doctor Who in Dr. Who and the Daleks (1965) and Daleks – Invasion Earth: 2150 A.D. (1966).

The role of the Second Doctor went to Patrick Troughton.

Third Doctor 
Ron Moody was said to be the producers' first choice after his success in Oliver! but he turned down the role, which he later regretted.

The role of the Third Doctor went to the producers' second choice, Jon Pertwee.

Fourth Doctor 
Graham Crowden, who played Soldeed in The Horns of Nimon (1979–1980), turned down the role as he would only commit to one year instead of the three years asked by producer Barry Letts, while Michael Bentine turned down the role when the production team felt he wanted too much influence over the series' scripts. Other actors considered included Bernard Cribbins, who played Wilfred Mott in the Revived Series, and Fulton Mackay, who had previously played Dr. Quinn in Doctor Who and the Silurians (1970).
Richard Hearne was offered the role but his insistence that he play the part in the style of his 'Mr Pastry' character was not acceptable to the series' producer, Barry Letts. Also considered was Carry On actor Jim Dale.

The role of the Fourth Doctor went to Tom Baker.

Fifth Doctor 
Richard Griffiths was considered by producers for the role when Tom Baker left.

The role of the Fifth Doctor went to Peter Davison.

Sixth Doctor 
The role of the Sixth Doctor was offered to Colin Baker without an audition. No auditions were held for the role, as Baker was the first choice.

Sylvester McCoy did express interest.

Seventh Doctor 
In 1986, the then Controller of BBC One, Michael Grade, unhappy with the current state of Doctor Who, wrote to Sydney Newman to enquire whether he had any ideas for reformatting the series. On 6 October 1986, Newman wrote back to Grade with a suggestion that Patrick Troughton should return to the role of the Doctor for a season, and then regenerate into a female, with Newman suggesting either Joanna Lumley, Dawn French or Frances de la Tour to succeed Troughton. Grade then suggested that Newman meet the current Head of Drama, Jonathan Powell, for lunch to discuss the ideas. Newman and Powell did not get on well, however, and nothing came of their meeting.

The final three actors considered for the role were Sylvester McCoy, Ken Campbell and Chris Jury. While Campbell's portrayal was considered too dark for the series, Jury was remembered by the production team and cast as Kingpin in 1988's The Greatest Show in the Galaxy, though many years later he disclosed that he had never known that he had been on the shortlist for the role.

McCoy's audition process included a read-through in costume of a sample scene, playing against Janet Fielding. The actors Dermot Crowley and David Fielder also auditioned for the role in the same manner. Andrew Sachs was offered the role of the Seventh Doctor but he turned it down later regretted it saying "it was one of his sad tales of failure in life" and hoped the offer came around again

The role of the Seventh Doctor went to Sylvester McCoy.

Eighth Doctor 
Had the show continued past 1989, the producers were again considering Richard Griffiths for the role of the Eighth Doctor.

In the early 1990s, the BBC approached Verity Lambert to revive the show. Lambert wanted Peter Cook to play the new Doctor at the time, but he eventually declined involvement.

Actors who auditioned for the role in the 1996 film included Michael Crawford, Rowan Atkinson (who played a spoof version of the Doctor in Curse of Fatal Death), Liam Cunningham (who appeared in the 2013 Doctor Who episode "Cold War"), Mark McGann (whose brother Paul McGann eventually got the role), Trevor Eve, Michael Palin, Robert Lindsay, Eric Idle, Tim McInnerny (who appeared in the 2008 Doctor Who episode "Planet of the Ood"), Nathaniel Parker, Peter Woodward, John Sessions (who later played Tannis in the audio drama Death Comes to Time, and voiced Gus in the 2014 Doctor Who episode Mummy on the Orient Express), Anthony Head (who appeared in the 2006 Doctor Who episode "School Reunion", narrated episodes of the Doctor Who Confidential behind-the-scenes series, and provided voice-acting work for both the televised The Infinite Quest and the Excelis story arc from Big Finish Productions), Rik Mayall, and Tony Slattery. Billy Connolly has stated that he was also considered for the part. Peter Capaldi was invited to audition, but declined, as he "didn't think [he] would get it, and... didn't want to just be part of a big cull of actors." Capaldi was eventually cast as the Twelfth Doctor. Harry Van Gorkum was cast as the role for the Eighth Doctor but the BBC, unlike Fox and Universal did not find him a fitting choice.
Roger Rees was approached and showed interest.

The role of the Eighth Doctor went to Paul McGann.

Ninth Doctor 
In 2003, Bill Baggs was set to make a 40th-anniversary special for BBC South with Alan Cumming as the Doctor. Baggs had directed numerous unofficial Doctor Who-related productions since the show's cancellation, including The Airzone Solution, which featured Cumming in another role. The special was cancelled when the BBC instead commissioned Russell T Davies to revive the series.

Hugh Grant (who also played an incarnation of the Doctor in Curse of Fatal Death) has stated that he turned down the role and expressed his regret once he saw how the show turned out. According to Russell T Davies, Martin Clunes (whose television debut had been in the serial "Snakedance" in 1983) was considered at an early stage of development.

Producer Jane Tranter also considered casting Judi Dench as the Ninth Doctor.

The role of the Ninth Doctor went to Christopher Eccleston.

Tenth Doctor 
When Christopher Eccleston was leaving the show after one season, A BBC article talked of actors David Tennant, David Thewlis, Richard E. Grant (Who appeared in the show in 2012 and 2013 as the Great Intelligence), Bill Nighy and Alan Davies. 

The role of the Tenth Doctor went to David Tennant.

Eleventh Doctor 
Russell Tovey auditioned and screen-tested for the part of the Doctor, having been recommended to Steven Moffat's new production team by outgoing showrunner Russell T Davies. Moffat briefly considered casting Peter Capaldi. On November 27, 2008, an Australian Newspaper reported a story hinting that Dutch/Australian actor David Knijnenburg was under consideration for the part. Despite the highly speculative nature of the report, it was neither confirmed nor denied by the BBC or the actor himself and the story was picked up by other sources. Comparatively unknown outside Australia, his appointment seemed unlikely although he was favourably recommended by previous Doctor Sylvester McCoy. The role was reportedly offered to Chiwetel Ejiofor, who turned it down. 

The role of the Eleventh Doctor went to Matt Smith.

Twelfth Doctor 
Ben Daniels revealed to Digital Spy that he had been included on a shortlist of actors in the running for the role, but was not the production team's first choice.

The role of the Twelfth Doctor went to Peter Capaldi.

Thirteenth Doctor 
When referring to if the new Doctor would be a woman, incoming Doctor Who showrunner Chris Chibnall originally was quoted in February 2017, as saying "Nothing is ruled out but I don’t want the casting to be a gimmick and that’s all I can say". The role of the Thirteenth Doctor went to Jodie Whittaker, the first woman to play the Doctor in the television series. She had previously worked with Chibnall in Broadchurch. Chibnall said that he always wanted a woman for the part and that Whittaker was their first choice. Whittaker has said that other actresses auditioned for the part.

Radio plays 
Boris Karloff was approached to play the Doctor for a proposed radio series by Stanmark Productions in the late 1960s. Karloff declined, and Peter Cushing was hired to reprise his film version of "Dr. Who" for a pilot episode titled "Journey into Time" that was recorded, but the BBC passed on the series. As of 2014, the location of the recording is unknown.

Unspecified
In 2013, Bill Nighy said that the BBC had approached him about the possibility of him playing the Doctor, but that he had declined, feeling that the role came with "too much baggage". Nighy did not specify when this occurred out of respect to the actor who was eventually cast. Nighy had appeared in the role of Dr. Black in the 2010 Doctor Who episode "Vincent and the Doctor".

In 2017, Alan Cumming said that he had been approached about playing the character on two occasions, once by Russell T Davies and once by Mark Gatiss, but that the deal-breaker both times had been his reluctance to relocate to Cardiff. Cumming later appeared in the 2018 Doctor Who episode "The Witchfinders" portraying King James I.

In 2022, Ben Miller stated on The One Show that he was asked if he would be interested in being Doctor Who "a few years" ago. He had said he was interested, but "never heard anything else ever again". Miller appeared as the Sheriff of Nottingham in the 2014 Doctor Who episode "Robot of Sherwood".

Alexei Sayle once wrote an article expressing he should be cast as The Doctor.

References

Actors who have played the Doctor

Doctor, Considered